Italian moths represent about 4,959 different types of moths. The moths (mostly nocturnal) and butterflies (mostly diurnal) together make up the taxonomic order Lepidoptera.

This is a list of moth species (families beginning Q-Z) which have been recorded in Italy, including San Marino, Sardinia, Sicily and Vatican City. Other parts of the list are at List of moths of Italy.

Roeslerstammiidae
Roeslerstammia erxlebella (Fabricius, 1787)

Saturniidae
Aglia tau (Linnaeus, 1758)
Antheraea yamamai (Guerin-Meneville, 1861)
Samia cynthia (Drury, 1773)
Saturnia pavoniella (Scopoli, 1763)
Saturnia pyri (Denis & Schiffermuller, 1775)

Schreckensteiniidae
Schreckensteinia festaliella (Hübner, 1819)

Scythrididae
Enolmis acanthella (Godart, 1824)
Enolmis agenjoi Passerin d'Entreves, 1988
Episcythris triangulella (Ragonot, 1874)
Eretmocera medinella (Staudinger, 1859)
Scythris acarioides Bengtsson, 1997
Scythris adustella Jackh, 1978
Scythris aerariella (Herrich-Schäffer, 1855)
Scythris alseriella (Turati, 1879)
Scythris amphonycella (Geyer, 1836)
Scythris arerai Huemer, 2000
Scythris aspromontis Jackh, 1978
Scythris baldensis Passerin d'Entreves, 1979
Scythris bolognella Jackh, 1978
Scythris bubaniae Walsingham, 1907
Scythris carboniella Jackh, 1978
Scythris cistorum (Milliere, 1876)
Scythris clavella (Zeller, 1855)
Scythris constanti Walsingham, 1898
Scythris crassiuscula (Herrich-Schäffer, 1855)
Scythris crypta Hannemann, 1961
Scythris cuspidella (Denis & Schiffermuller, 1775)
Scythris derrai Bengtsson, 1991
Scythris dissimilella (Herrich-Schäffer, 1855)
Scythris dissitella (Zeller, 1847)
Scythris fallacella (Schlager, 1847)
Scythris flavilaterella (Fuchs, 1886)
Scythris flaviventrella (Herrich-Schäffer, 1855)
Scythris fuscoaenea (Haworth, 1828)
Scythris glacialis (Frey, 1870)
Scythris gravatella (Zeller, 1847)
Scythris heinemanni (Moschler, 1869)
Scythris hornigii (Zeller, 1855)
Scythris imperiella Jackh, 1978
Scythris inertella (Zeller, 1855)
Scythris inspersella (Hübner, 1817)
Scythris lagunae Jackh, 1978
Scythris laminella (Denis & Schiffermuller, 1775)
Scythris limbella (Fabricius, 1775)
Scythris mediella (Constant, 1855)
Scythris mus Walsingham, 1898
Scythris nigrella Jackh, 1978
Scythris noricella (Zeller, 1843)
Scythris obscurella (Scopoli, 1763)
Scythris pascuella (Zeller, 1855)
Scythris picaepennis (Haworth, 1828)
Scythris productella (Zeller, 1839)
Scythris punctivittella (O. Costa, 1836)
Scythris ridiculella Caradja, 1920
Scythris sappadensis Bengtsson, 1992
Scythris scopolella (Linnaeus, 1767)
Scythris seliniella (Zeller, 1839)
Scythris siccella (Zeller, 1839)
Scythris siculella Jackh, 1977
Scythris speyeri (Heinemann & Wocke, 1876)
Scythris subseliniella (Heinemann, 1876)
Scythris tabidella (Herrich-Schäffer, 1855)
Scythris tauromeniella Passerin d'Entreves & Roggero, 2004
Scythris tenuivittella (Stainton, 1867)
Scythris tergestinella (Zeller, 1855)
Scythris tremalzoi Bengtsson, 1992
Scythris tributella (Zeller, 1847)
Scythris trinacriae Passerin d'Entreves, 1984
Scythris villari Agenjo, 1971
Scythris vittella (O. Costa, 1834)

Sesiidae
Bembecia albanensis (Rebel, 1918)
Bembecia flavida (Oberthur, 1890)
Bembecia himmighoffeni (Staudinger, 1866)
Bembecia hymenopteriformis (Bellier, 1860)
Bembecia iberica Spatenka, 1992
Bembecia ichneumoniformis (Denis & Schiffermuller, 1775)
Bembecia psoraleae Bartsch & Bettag, 1997
Bembecia scopigera (Scopoli, 1763)
Bembecia sirphiformis (Lucas, 1849)
Bembecia tunetana (Le Cerf, 1920)
Bembecia uroceriformis (Treitschke, 1834)
Chamaesphecia aerifrons (Zeller, 1847)
Chamaesphecia anthraciformis (Rambur, 1832)
Chamaesphecia bibioniformis (Esper, 1800)
Chamaesphecia chalciformis (Esper, 1804)
Chamaesphecia doleriformis (Herrich-Schäffer, 1846)
Chamaesphecia dumonti Le Cerf, 1922
Chamaesphecia empiformis (Esper, 1783)
Chamaesphecia euceraeformis (Ochsenheimer, 1816)
Chamaesphecia leucopsiformis (Esper, 1800)
Chamaesphecia masariformis (Ochsenheimer, 1808)
Chamaesphecia maurusia Pungeler, 1912
Chamaesphecia mysiniformis (Boisduval, 1840)
Chamaesphecia osmiaeformis (Herrich-Schäffer, 1848)
Chamaesphecia palustris Kautz, 1927
Chamaesphecia schmidtiiformis (Freyer, 1836)
Chamaesphecia staudingeri (Failla-Tedaldi, 1890)
Chamaesphecia thracica Z. Lastuvka, 1983
Paranthrene insolitus Le Cerf, 1914
Paranthrene tabaniformis (Rottemburg, 1775)
Pennisetia hylaeiformis (Laspeyres, 1801)
Pyropteron affinis (Staudinger, 1856)
Pyropteron chrysidiformis (Esper, 1782)
Pyropteron doryliformis (Ochsenheimer, 1808)
Pyropteron leucomelaena (Zeller, 1847)
Pyropteron meriaeformis (Boisduval, 1840)
Pyropteron muscaeformis (Esper, 1783)
Pyropteron triannuliformis (Freyer, 1843)
Sesia apiformis (Clerck, 1759)
Sesia bembeciformis (Hübner, 1806)
Sesia melanocephala Dalman, 1816
Synanthedon andrenaeformis (Laspeyres, 1801)
Synanthedon cephiformis (Ochsenheimer, 1808)
Synanthedon codeti (Oberthur, 1881)
Synanthedon conopiformis (Esper, 1782)
Synanthedon culiciformis (Linnaeus, 1758)
Synanthedon flaviventris (Staudinger, 1883)
Synanthedon formicaeformis (Esper, 1783)
Synanthedon loranthi (Kralicek, 1966)
Synanthedon melliniformis (Laspeyres, 1801)
Synanthedon myopaeformis (Borkhausen, 1789)
Synanthedon polaris (Staudinger, 1877)
Synanthedon scoliaeformis (Borkhausen, 1789)
Synanthedon spheciformis (Denis & Schiffermuller, 1775)
Synanthedon spuleri (Fuchs, 1908)
Synanthedon stomoxiformis (Hübner, 1790)
Synanthedon tipuliformis (Clerck, 1759)
Synanthedon vespiformis (Linnaeus, 1761)
Tinthia tineiformis (Esper, 1789)

Somabrachyidae
Somabrachys aegrota (Klug, 1830)

Sphingidae
Acherontia atropos (Linnaeus, 1758)
Agrius convolvuli (Linnaeus, 1758)
Daphnis nerii (Linnaeus, 1758)
Deilephila elpenor (Linnaeus, 1758)
Deilephila porcellus (Linnaeus, 1758)
Hemaris croatica (Esper, 1800)
Hemaris fuciformis (Linnaeus, 1758)
Hemaris tityus (Linnaeus, 1758)
Hippotion celerio (Linnaeus, 1758)
Hyles dahlii (Geyer, 1828)
Hyles euphorbiae (Linnaeus, 1758)
Hyles gallii (Rottemburg, 1775)
Hyles hippophaes (Esper, 1789)
Hyles livornica (Esper, 1780)
Hyles nicaea (de Prunner, 1798)
Hyles vespertilio (Esper, 1780)
Laothoe populi (Linnaeus, 1758)
Macroglossum stellatarum (Linnaeus, 1758)
Marumba quercus (Denis & Schiffermuller, 1775)
Mimas tiliae (Linnaeus, 1758)
Proserpinus proserpina (Pallas, 1772)
Smerinthus ocellata (Linnaeus, 1758)
Sphinx ligustri Linnaeus, 1758
Sphinx pinastri Linnaeus, 1758

Stathmopodidae
Neomariania partinicensis (Rebel, 1937)
Stathmopoda pedella (Linnaeus, 1761)

Thyrididae
Thyris fenestrella (Scopoli, 1763)

Tineidae
Agnathosia mendicella (Denis & Schiffermuller, 1775)
Anomalotinea gardesanella (Hartig, 1950)
Anomalotinea liguriella (Milliere, 1879)
Archinemapogon yildizae Kocak, 1981
Ateliotum hungaricellum Zeller, 1839
Ateliotum insulare (Rebel, 1896)
Ateliotum petrinella (Herrich-Schäffer, 1854)
Cephimallota angusticostella (Zeller, 1839)
Cephimallota crassiflavella Bruand, 1851
Crassicornella crassicornella (Zeller, 1847)
Dryadaula heindeli Gaedike & Scholz, 1998
Elatobia fuliginosella (Lienig & Zeller, 1846)
Eudarcia brachyptera (Passerin d'Entreves, 1974)
Eudarcia leopoldella (O. G. Costa, 1836)
Eudarcia nerviella (Amsel, 1954)
Eudarcia nigraella (Mariani, 1937)
Eudarcia pagenstecherella (Hübner, 1825)
Eudarcia palanfreella Baldizzone & Gaedike, 2004
Eudarcia sardoa (Passerin d'Entreves, 1978)
Eudarcia vacriensis (Parenti, 1964)
Eudarcia aureliani (Capuse, 1967)
Eudarcia confusella (Heydenreich, 1851)
Eudarcia derrai (Gaedike, 1983)
Eudarcia granulatella (Zeller, 1852)
Eudarcia hedemanni (Rebel, 1899)
Eudarcia romanum (Petersen, 1968)
Euplocamus anthracinalis (Scopoli, 1763)
Haplotinea ditella (Pierce & Metcalfe, 1938)
Haplotinea insectella (Fabricius, 1794)
Infurcitinea albicomella (Stainton, 1851)
Infurcitinea argentimaculella (Stainton, 1849)
Infurcitinea atrifasciella (Staudinger, 1871)
Infurcitinea belviella Gaedike, 1980
Infurcitinea captans Gozmany, 1960
Infurcitinea finalis Gozmany, 1959
Infurcitinea ignicomella (Zeller, 1852)
Infurcitinea italica (Amsel, 1954)
Infurcitinea klimeschi Passerin d'Entreves, 1974
Infurcitinea parentii Petersen, 1964
Infurcitinea roesslerella (Heyden, 1865)
Infurcitinea rumelicella (Rebel, 1903)
Infurcitinea sardica (Amsel, 1952)
Infurcitinea sardiniella Vari, 1942
Infurcitinea siciliana Petersen, 1964
Infurcitinea teriolella (Amsel, 1954)
Infurcitinea yildizae Kocak, 1981
Karsholtia marianii (Rebel, 1936)
Lichenotinea maculata Petersen, 1957
Lichenotinea pustulatella (Zeller, 1852)
Monopis crocicapitella (Clemens, 1859)
Monopis imella (Hübner, 1813)
Monopis laevigella (Denis & Schiffermuller, 1775)
Monopis monachella (Hübner, 1796)
Monopis nigricantella (Milliere, 1872)
Monopis obviella (Denis & Schiffermuller, 1775)
Monopis weaverella (Scott, 1858)
Montescardia tessulatellus (Zeller, 1846)
Montetinea montana Petersen, 1957
Montetinea tenuicornella (Klimesch, 1942)
Morophaga choragella (Denis & Schiffermuller, 1775)
Morophaga morella (Duponchel, 1838)
Myrmecozela ataxella (Chretien, 1905)
Myrmecozela ochraceella (Tengstrom, 1848)
Nemapogon agenjoi Petersen, 1959
Nemapogon arcosuensis Gaedike, 2007
Nemapogon clematella (Fabricius, 1781)
Nemapogon cloacella (Haworth, 1828)
Nemapogon granella (Linnaeus, 1758)
Nemapogon gravosaellus Petersen, 1957
Nemapogon hungaricus Gozmany, 1960
Nemapogon inconditella (Lucas, 1956)
Nemapogon nevadella (Caradja, 1920)
Nemapogon picarella (Clerck, 1759)
Nemapogon ruricolella (Stainton, 1849)
Nemapogon sardicus Gaedike, 1983
Nemapogon signatellus Petersen, 1957
Nemapogon similella Gaedike, 2007
Nemapogon somchetiella Zagulajev, 1961
Nemapogon variatella (Clemens, 1859)
Nemapogon wolffiella Karsholt & Nielsen, 1976
Nemaxera betulinella (Fabricius, 1787)
Neurothaumasia ankerella (Mann, 1867)
Neurothaumasia ragusaella (Wocke, 1889)
Niditinea fuscella (Linnaeus, 1758)
Niditinea striolella (Matsumura, 1931)
Niditinea truncicolella (Tengstrom, 1848)
Novotinea carbonifera (Walsingham, 1900)
Novotinea liguriella Amsel, 1950
Novotinea mistrettae Parenti, 1966
Opogona omoscopa (Meyrick, 1893)
Phereoeca allutella (Rebel, 1892)
Proterospastis merdella (Zeller, 1847)
Reisserita panormitanella (Mann, 1859)
Reisserita relicinella (Herrich-Schäffer, 1853)
Rhodobates unicolor (Staudinger, 1870)
Scardia boletella (Fabricius, 1794)
Stenoptinea cyaneimarmorella (Milliere, 1854)
Tenaga nigripunctella (Haworth, 1828)
Tenaga rhenania (Petersen, 1962)
Tinea basifasciella Ragonot, 1895
Tinea columbariella Wocke, 1877
Tinea dubiella Stainton, 1859
Tinea flavescentella Haworth, 1828
Tinea messalina Robinson, 1979
Tinea murariella Staudinger, 1859
Tinea nonimella (Zagulajev, 1955)
Tinea pallescentella Stainton, 1851
Tinea pellionella Linnaeus, 1758
Tinea semifulvella Haworth, 1828
Tinea translucens Meyrick, 1917
Tinea trinotella Thunberg, 1794
Tineola bisselliella (Hummel, 1823)
Triaxomasia caprimulgella (Stainton, 1851)
Triaxomera baldensis Petersen, 1983
Triaxomera marsica Petersen, 1984
Triaxomera parasitella (Hübner, 1796)
Trichophaga bipartitella (Ragonot, 1892)
Trichophaga tapetzella (Linnaeus, 1758)

Tischeriidae
Coptotriche angusticollella (Duponchel, 1843)
Coptotriche gaunacella (Duponchel, 1843)
Coptotriche heinemanni (Wocke, 1871)
Coptotriche marginea (Haworth, 1828)
Tischeria decidua Wocke, 1876
Tischeria dodonaea Stainton, 1858
Tischeria ekebladella (Bjerkander, 1795)

Tortricidae
Acleris abietana (Hübner, 1822)
Acleris aspersana (Hübner, 1817)
Acleris bergmanniana (Linnaeus, 1758)
Acleris comariana (Lienig & Zeller, 1846)
Acleris cristana (Denis & Schiffermuller, 1775)
Acleris emargana (Fabricius, 1775)
Acleris ferrugana (Denis & Schiffermuller, 1775)
Acleris fimbriana (Thunberg, 1791)
Acleris forsskaleana (Linnaeus, 1758)
Acleris hastiana (Linnaeus, 1758)
Acleris hippophaeana (Heyden, 1865)
Acleris holmiana (Linnaeus, 1758)
Acleris hyemana (Haworth, 1811)
Acleris kochiella (Goeze, 1783)
Acleris lacordairana (Duponchel, 1836)
Acleris laterana (Fabricius, 1794)
Acleris lipsiana (Denis & Schiffermuller, 1775)
Acleris literana (Linnaeus, 1758)
Acleris logiana (Clerck, 1759)
Acleris notana (Donovan, 1806)
Acleris permutana (Duponchel, 1836)
Acleris quercinana (Zeller, 1849)
Acleris rhombana (Denis & Schiffermuller, 1775)
Acleris roscidana (Hübner, 1799)
Acleris rufana (Denis & Schiffermuller, 1775)
Acleris schalleriana (Linnaeus, 1761)
Acleris shepherdana (Stephens, 1852)
Acleris sparsana (Denis & Schiffermuller, 1775)
Acleris umbrana (Hübner, 1799)
Acleris variegana (Denis & Schiffermuller, 1775)
Acroclita subsequana (Herrich-Schäffer, 1851)
Adoxophyes orana (Fischer v. Röslerstamm, 1834)
Aethes ardezana (Muller-Rutz, 1922)
Aethes aurofasciana (Mann, 1855)
Aethes beatricella (Walsingham, 1898)
Aethes bilbaensis (Rossler, 1877)
Aethes caucasica (Amsel, 1959)
Aethes cnicana (Westwood, 1854)
Aethes deaurana (Peyerimhoff, 1877)
Aethes decimana (Denis & Schiffermuller, 1775)
Aethes deutschiana (Zetterstedt, 1839)
Aethes dilucidana (Stephens, 1852)
Aethes flagellana (Duponchel, 1836)
Aethes francillana (Fabricius, 1794)
Aethes hartmanniana (Clerck, 1759)
Aethes kasyi Razowski, 1962
Aethes kindermanniana (Treitschke, 1830)
Aethes languidana (Mann, 1855)
Aethes margaritana (Haworth, 1811)
Aethes margarotana (Duponchel, 1836)
Aethes mauritanica (Walsingham, 1898)
Aethes moribundana (Staudinger, 1859)
Aethes piercei Obraztsov, 1952
Aethes rubigana (Treitschke, 1830)
Aethes rubiginana (Walsingham, 1903)
Aethes rutilana (Hübner, 1817)
Aethes sanguinana (Treitschke, 1830)
Aethes scalana (Zerny, 1927)
Aethes smeathmanniana (Fabricius, 1781)
Aethes tesserana (Denis & Schiffermuller, 1775)
Aethes tornella (Walsingham, 1898)
Aethes vicinana (Mann, 1859)
Aethes williana (Brahm, 1791)
Agapeta hamana (Linnaeus, 1758)
Agapeta zoegana (Linnaeus, 1767)
Aleimma loeflingiana (Linnaeus, 1758)
Ancylis achatana (Denis & Schiffermuller, 1775)
Ancylis apicella (Denis & Schiffermuller, 1775)
Ancylis badiana (Denis & Schiffermuller, 1775)
Ancylis comptana (Frolich, 1828)
Ancylis geminana (Donovan, 1806)
Ancylis laetana (Fabricius, 1775)
Ancylis mitterbacheriana (Denis & Schiffermuller, 1775)
Ancylis myrtillana (Treitschke, 1830)
Ancylis obtusana (Haworth, 1811)
Ancylis paludana Barrett, 1871
Ancylis selenana (Guenee, 1845)
Ancylis tineana (Hübner, 1799)
Ancylis uncella (Denis & Schiffermuller, 1775)
Ancylis unculana (Haworth, 1811)
Ancylis unguicella (Linnaeus, 1758)
Ancylis upupana (Treitschke, 1835)
Aneuxanthis locupletana (Hübner, 1819)
Aphelia viburniana (Denis & Schiffermuller, 1775)
Aphelia ferugana (Hübner, 1793)
Aphelia paleana (Hübner, 1793)
Aphelia peramplana (Hübner, 1825)
Aphelia unitana (Hübner, 1799)
Apotomis betuletana (Haworth, 1811)
Apotomis capreana (Hübner, 1817)
Apotomis infida (Heinrich, 1926)
Apotomis inundana (Denis & Schiffermuller, 1775)
Apotomis lineana (Denis & Schiffermuller, 1775)
Apotomis sauciana (Frolich, 1828)
Apotomis semifasciana (Haworth, 1811)
Apotomis sororculana (Zetterstedt, 1839)
Apotomis turbidana Hübner, 1825
Archicnephasia hartigi Razowski, 1983
Archips betulana (Hübner, 1787)
Archips crataegana (Hübner, 1799)
Archips oporana (Linnaeus, 1758)
Archips podana (Scopoli, 1763)
Archips rosana (Linnaeus, 1758)
Archips xylosteana (Linnaeus, 1758)
Argyroploce arbutella (Linnaeus, 1758)
Argyroploce noricana (Herrich-Schäffer, 1851)
Argyroploce roseomaculana (Herrich-Schäffer, 1851)
Argyrotaenia ljungiana (Thunberg, 1797)
Aterpia anderreggana Guenee, 1845
Aterpia circumfluxana (Christoph, 1881)
Aterpia corticana (Denis & Schiffermuller, 1775)
Avaria hyerana (Milliere, 1858)
Bactra bactrana (Kennel, 1901)
Bactra furfurana (Haworth, 1811)
Bactra lancealana (Hübner, 1799)
Bactra robustana (Christoph, 1872)
Bactra venosana (Zeller, 1847)
Cacoecimorpha pronubana (Hübner, 1799)
Capricornia boisduvaliana (Duponchel, 1836)
Capua vulgana (Frolich, 1828)
Celypha aurofasciana (Haworth, 1811)
Celypha cespitana (Hübner, 1817)
Celypha doubledayana (Barrett, 1872)
Celypha flavipalpana (Herrich-Schäffer, 1851)
Celypha lacunana (Denis & Schiffermuller, 1775)
Celypha rivulana (Scopoli, 1763)
Celypha rosaceana Schlager, 1847
Celypha rufana (Scopoli, 1763)
Celypha rurestrana (Duponchel, 1843)
Celypha siderana (Treitschke, 1835)
Celypha striana (Denis & Schiffermuller, 1775)
Celypha woodiana (Barrett, 1882)
Choristoneura diversana (Hübner, 1817)
Choristoneura hebenstreitella (Muller, 1764)
Choristoneura lafauryana (Ragonot, 1875)
Choristoneura murinana (Hübner, 1799)
Clavigesta sylvestrana (Curtis, 1850)
Clepsis consimilana (Hübner, 1817)
Clepsis dumicolana (Zeller, 1847)
Clepsis lindebergi (Krogerus, 1952)
Clepsis neglectana (Herrich-Schäffer, 1851)
Clepsis pallidana (Fabricius, 1776)
Clepsis rogana (Guenee, 1845)
Clepsis rolandriana (Linnaeus, 1758)
Clepsis rurinana (Linnaeus, 1758)
Clepsis senecionana (Hübner, 1819)
Clepsis siciliana (Ragonot, 1894)
Clepsis spectrana (Treitschke, 1830)
Clepsis steineriana (Hübner, 1799)
Clepsis unicolorana (Duponchel, 1835)
Cnephasia alticolana (Herrich-Schäffer, 1851)
Cnephasia amseli (D. Lucas, 1942)
Cnephasia asseclana (Denis & Schiffermuller, 1775)
Cnephasia chrysantheana (Duponchel, 1843)
Cnephasia communana (Herrich-Schäffer, 1851)
Cnephasia conspersana Douglas, 1846
Cnephasia cupressivorana (Staudinger, 1871)
Cnephasia daedalea Razowski, 1983
Cnephasia ecullyana Real, 1951
Cnephasia fragosana (Zeller, 1847)
Cnephasia genitalana Pierce & Metcalfe, 1922
Cnephasia gueneeana (Duponchel, 1836)
Cnephasia heinemanni Obraztsov, 1956
Cnephasia hellenica Obraztsov, 1956
Cnephasia longana (Haworth, 1811)
Cnephasia pasiuana (Hübner, 1799)
Cnephasia pumicana (Zeller, 1847)
Cnephasia sedana (Constant, 1884)
Cnephasia stephensiana (Doubleday, 1849)
Cnephasia zangheriana Trematerra, 1991
Cnephasia abrasana (Duponchel, 1843)
Cnephasia etnana Razowski & Trematerral, 1999
Cnephasia incertana (Treitschke, 1835)
Cochylidia heydeniana (Herrich-Schäffer, 1851)
Cochylidia implicitana (Wocke, 1856)
Cochylidia moguntiana (Rossler, 1864)
Cochylidia richteriana (Fischer v. Röslerstamm, 1837)
Cochylidia rupicola (Curtis, 1834)
Cochylidia subroseana (Haworth, 1811)
Cochylimorpha alternana (Stephens, 1834)
Cochylimorpha decolorella (Zeller, 1839)
Cochylimorpha elongana (Fischer v. Röslerstamm, 1839)
Cochylimorpha erlebachi Huemer & Trematerra, 1997
Cochylimorpha fucosa (Razowski, 1970)
Cochylimorpha halophilana (Christoph, 1872)
Cochylimorpha hilarana (Herrich-Schäffer, 1851)
Cochylimorpha jucundana (Treitschke, 1835)
Cochylimorpha meridiana (Staudinger, 1859)
Cochylimorpha perfusana (Guenee, 1845)
Cochylimorpha peucedana (Ragonot, 1889)
Cochylimorpha sparsana (Staudinger, 1879)
Cochylimorpha straminea (Haworth, 1811)
Cochylimorpha tiraculana (Bassi & Scaramozzino, 1989)
Cochylimorpha woliniana (Schleich, 1868)
Cochylis atricapitana (Stephens, 1852)
Cochylis dubitana (Hübner, 1799)
Cochylis epilinana Duponchel, 1842
Cochylis flaviciliana (Westwood, 1854)
Cochylis hybridella (Hübner, 1813)
Cochylis molliculana Zeller, 1847
Cochylis nana (Haworth, 1811)
Cochylis pallidana Zeller, 1847
Cochylis posterana Zeller, 1847
Cochylis roseana (Haworth, 1811)
Cochylis salebrana (Mann, 1862)
Cochylis sannitica Trematerra, 1995
Commophila aeneana (Hübner, 1800)
Corticivora piniana (Herrich-Schäffer, 1851)
Crocidosema plebejana Zeller, 1847
Cryptocochylis conjunctana (Mann, 1864)
Cydia adenocarpi (Ragonot, 1875)
Cydia albipicta (Sauter, 1968)
Cydia amplana (Hübner, 1800)
Cydia cognatana (Barrett, 1874)
Cydia coniferana (Saxesen, 1840)
Cydia corollana (Hübner, 1823)
Cydia cosmophorana (Treitschke, 1835)
Cydia cythisanthana Burmann & Prose, 1988
Cydia derrai Prose, 1988
Cydia duplicana (Zetterstedt, 1839)
Cydia exquisitana (Rebel, 1889)
Cydia fagiglandana (Zeller, 1841)
Cydia gilviciliana (Staudinger, 1859)
Cydia ilipulana (Walsingham, 1903)
Cydia illutana (Herrich-Schäffer, 1851)
Cydia inquinatana (Hübner, 1800)
Cydia interscindana (Moschler, 1866)
Cydia intexta (Kuznetsov, 1962)
Cydia johanssoni Aarvik & Karsholt, 1993
Cydia leguminana (Lienig & Zeller, 1846)
Cydia medicaginis (Kuznetsov, 1962)
Cydia microgrammana (Guenee, 1845)
Cydia millenniana (Adamczewski, 1967)
Cydia multistriana (Chretien, 1915)
Cydia nigricana (Fabricius, 1794)
Cydia oxytropidis (Martini, 1912)
Cydia pactolana (Zeller, 1840)
Cydia plumbiferana (Staudinger, 1870)
Cydia pomonella (Linnaeus, 1758)
Cydia pyrivora (Danilevsky, 1947)
Cydia semicinctana (Kennel, 1901)
Cydia servillana (Duponchel, 1836)
Cydia splendana (Hübner, 1799)
Cydia strobilella (Linnaeus, 1758)
Cydia succedana (Denis & Schiffermuller, 1775)
Cydia trogodana Prose, 1988
Cydia ulicetana (Haworth, 1811)
Cydia vallesiaca (Sauter, 1968)
Cydia zebeana (Ratzeburg, 1840)
Cymolomia hartigiana (Saxesen, 1840)
Diceratura ostrinana (Guenee, 1845)
Diceratura rhodograpta Djakonov, 1929
Diceratura roseofasciana (Mann, 1855)
Dichelia histrionana (Frolich, 1828)
Dichrorampha acuminatana (Lienig & Zeller, 1846)
Dichrorampha aeratana (Pierce & Metcalfe, 1915)
Dichrorampha agilana (Tengstrom, 1848)
Dichrorampha alexandrae Passerin d'Entreves, 1972
Dichrorampha alpigenana (Heinemann, 1863)
Dichrorampha alpinana (Treitschke, 1830)
Dichrorampha baixerasana Trematerra, 1991
Dichrorampha bugnionana (Duponchel, 1843)
Dichrorampha cacaleana (Herrich-Schäffer, 1851)
Dichrorampha chavanneana (de La Harpe, 1858)
Dichrorampha consortana Stephens, 1852
Dichrorampha distinctana (Heinemann, 1863)
Dichrorampha eximia (Danilevsky, 1948)
Dichrorampha flavidorsana Knaggs, 1867
Dichrorampha forsteri Obraztsov, 1953
Dichrorampha gemellana (Zeller, 1847)
Dichrorampha gruneriana (Herrich-Schäffer, 1851)
Dichrorampha harpeana Frey, 1870
Dichrorampha heegerana (Duponchel, 1843)
Dichrorampha incognitana (Kremky & Maslowski, 1933)
Dichrorampha incursana (Herrich-Schäffer, 1851)
Dichrorampha infuscata (Danilevsky, 1960)
Dichrorampha klimeschiana Toll, 1955
Dichrorampha letarfensis Gibeaux, 1983
Dichrorampha ligulana (Herrich-Schäffer, 1851)
Dichrorampha montanana (Duponchel, 1843)
Dichrorampha nigrobrunneana (Toll, 1942)
Dichrorampha petiverella (Linnaeus, 1758)
Dichrorampha plumbagana (Treitschke, 1830)
Dichrorampha plumbana (Scopoli, 1763)
Dichrorampha sedatana Busck, 1906
Dichrorampha senectana Guenee, 1845
Dichrorampha sequana (Hübner, 1799)
Dichrorampha simpliciana (Haworth, 1811)
Dichrorampha thomanni Huemer, 1991
Dichrorampha vancouverana McDunnough, 1935
Ditula angustiorana (Haworth, 1811)
Ditula saturana (Turati, 1913)
Doloploca punctulana (Denis & Schiffermuller, 1775)
Eana derivana (de La Harpe, 1858)
Eana incanana (Stephens, 1852)
Eana italica (Obraztsov, 1950)
Eana joannisi (Schawerda, 1929)
Eana penziana (Thunberg, 1791)
Eana viardi (Real, 1953)
Eana argentana (Clerck, 1759)
Eana osseana (Scopoli, 1763)
Eana canescana (Guenee, 1845)
Enarmonia formosana (Scopoli, 1763)
Endothenia ericetana (Humphreys & Westwood, 1845)
Endothenia gentianaeana (Hübner, 1799)
Endothenia lapideana (Herrich-Schäffer, 1851)
Endothenia marginana (Haworth, 1811)
Endothenia nigricostana (Haworth, 1811)
Endothenia oblongana (Haworth, 1811)
Endothenia pauperculana (Staudinger, 1859)
Endothenia quadrimaculana (Haworth, 1811)
Endothenia sororiana (Herrich-Schäffer, 1850)
Endothenia ustulana (Haworth, 1811)
Epagoge grotiana (Fabricius, 1781)
Epiblema absconditana (La Harpe, 1860)
Epiblema chretieni Obraztsov, 1952
Epiblema cnicicolana (Zeller, 1847)
Epiblema costipunctana (Haworth, 1811)
Epiblema foenella (Linnaeus, 1758)
Epiblema grandaevana (Lienig & Zeller, 1846)
Epiblema graphana (Treitschke, 1835)
Epiblema hepaticana (Treitschke, 1835)
Epiblema inulivora (Meyrick, 1932)
Epiblema sarmatana (Christoph, 1872)
Epiblema scutulana (Denis & Schiffermuller, 1775)
Epiblema similana (Denis & Schiffermuller, 1775)
Epiblema simploniana (Duponchel, 1835)
Epiblema sticticana (Fabricius, 1794)
Epiblema turbidana (Treitschke, 1835)
Epichoristodes acerbella (Walker, 1864)
Epinotia abbreviana (Fabricius, 1794)
Epinotia bilunana (Haworth, 1811)
Epinotia brunnichana (Linnaeus, 1767)
Epinotia crenana (Hübner, 1799)
Epinotia cruciana (Linnaeus, 1761)
Epinotia dalmatana (Rebel, 1891)
Epinotia demarniana (Fischer v. Röslerstamm, 1840)
Epinotia festivana (Hübner, 1799)
Epinotia fraternana (Haworth, 1811)
Epinotia granitana (Herrich-Schäffer, 1851)
Epinotia immundana (Fischer v. Röslerstamm, 1839)
Epinotia kochiana (Herrich-Schäffer, 1851)
Epinotia maculana (Fabricius, 1775)
Epinotia mercuriana (Frolich, 1828)
Epinotia nanana (Treitschke, 1835)
Epinotia nemorivaga (Tengstrom, 1848)
Epinotia nigricana (Herrich-Schäffer, 1851)
Epinotia nisella (Clerck, 1759)
Epinotia pygmaeana (Hübner, 1799)
Epinotia ramella (Linnaeus, 1758)
Epinotia rubiginosana (Herrich-Schäffer, 1851)
Epinotia signatana (Douglas, 1845)
Epinotia solandriana (Linnaeus, 1758)
Epinotia sordidana (Hübner, 1824)
Epinotia subocellana (Donovan, 1806)
Epinotia subsequana (Haworth, 1811)
Epinotia subuculana (Rebel, 1903)
Epinotia tedella (Clerck, 1759)
Epinotia tenerana (Denis & Schiffermuller, 1775)
Epinotia tetraquetrana (Haworth, 1811)
Epinotia thapsiana (Zeller, 1847)
Epinotia trigonella (Linnaeus, 1758)
Eriopsela fenestrellensis Huemer, 1991
Eriopsela quadrana (Hübner, 1813)
Eucosma aemulana (Schlager, 1849)
Eucosma albidulana (Herrich-Schäffer, 1851)
Eucosma albuneana (Zeller, 1847)
Eucosma aspidiscana (Hübner, 1817)
Eucosma balatonana (Osthelder, 1937)
Eucosma campoliliana (Denis & Schiffermuller, 1775)
Eucosma cana (Haworth, 1811)
Eucosma conformana (Mann, 1872)
Eucosma conterminana (Guenee, 1845)
Eucosma fervidana (Zeller, 1847)
Eucosma flavispecula Kuznetsov, 1964
Eucosma gradensis (Galvagni, 1909)
Eucosma hohenwartiana (Denis & Schiffermuller, 1775)
Eucosma individiosana (Kennel, 1901)
Eucosma lacteana (Treitschke, 1835)
Eucosma lugubrana (Treitschke, 1830)
Eucosma metzneriana (Treitschke, 1830)
Eucosma mirificana (Peyerimhoff, 1876)
Eucosma monstratana (Rebel, 1906)
Eucosma obumbratana (Lienig & Zeller, 1846)
Eucosma parvulana (Wilkinson, 1859)
Eucosma pupillana (Clerck, 1759)
Eucosma rubescana (Constant, 1895)
Eucosma sardoensis (Rebel, 1935)
Eucosma scorzonerana (Benander, 1942)
Eucosma tripoliana (Barrett, 1880)
Eucosma wimmerana (Treitschke, 1835)
Eucosmomorpha albersana (Hübner, 1813)
Eudemis porphyrana (Hübner, 1799)
Eudemis profundana (Denis & Schiffermuller, 1775)
Eugnosta magnificana (Rebel, 1914)
Eulia ministrana (Linnaeus, 1758)
Eupoecilia ambiguella (Hübner, 1796)
Eupoecilia angustana (Hübner, 1799)
Eupoecilia sanguisorbana (Herrich-Schäffer, 1856)
Exapate congelatella (Clerck, 1759)
Exapate duratella Heyden, 1864
Falseuncaria degreyana (McLachlan, 1869)
Falseuncaria ruficiliana (Haworth, 1811)
Fulvoclysia nerminae Kocak, 1982
Gibberifera simplana (Fischer v. Röslerstamm, 1836)
Grapholita andabatana (Wolff, 1957)
Grapholita funebrana Treitschke, 1835
Grapholita janthinana (Duponchel, 1843)
Grapholita lobarzewskii (Nowicki, 1860)
Grapholita molesta (Busck, 1916)
Grapholita tenebrosana Duponchel, 1843
Grapholita aureolana Tengstrom, 1848
Grapholita caecana Schlager, 1847
Grapholita compositella (Fabricius, 1775)
Grapholita coronillana Lienig & Zeller, 1846
Grapholita delineana Walker, 1863
Grapholita difficilana (Walsingham, 1900)
Grapholita discretana Wocke, 1861
Grapholita fissana (Frolich, 1828)
Grapholita gemmiferana Treitschke, 1835
Grapholita internana (Guenee, 1845)
Grapholita jungiella (Clerck, 1759)
Grapholita larseni Rebel, 1903
Grapholita lathyrana (Hübner, 1822)
Grapholita lunulana (Denis & Schiffermuller, 1775)
Grapholita nebritana Treitschke, 1830
Grapholita orobana Treitschke, 1830
Grapholita pallifrontana Lienig & Zeller, 1846
Gynnidomorpha alismana (Ragonot, 1883)
Gynnidomorpha minimana (Caradja, 1916)
Gynnidomorpha permixtana (Denis & Schiffermuller, 1775)
Gynnidomorpha rubricana (Peyerimhoff, 1877)
Gynnidomorpha vectisana (Humphreys & Westwood, 1845)
Gypsonoma aceriana (Duponchel, 1843)
Gypsonoma dealbana (Frolich, 1828)
Gypsonoma imparana (Muller-Rutz, 1914)
Gypsonoma minutana (Hübner, 1799)
Gypsonoma nitidulana (Lienig & Zeller, 1846)
Gypsonoma oppressana (Treitschke, 1835)
Gypsonoma sociana (Haworth, 1811)
Hedya dimidiana (Clerck, 1759)
Hedya nubiferana (Haworth, 1811)
Hedya ochroleucana (Frolich, 1828)
Hedya pruniana (Hübner, 1799)
Hedya salicella (Linnaeus, 1758)
Hysterophora maculosana (Haworth, 1811)
Isotrias huemeri Trematerra, 1993
Isotrias hybridana (Hübner, 1817)
Isotrias joannisana (Turati, 1921)
Isotrias martelliana Trematerra, 1990
Isotrias rectifasciana (Haworth, 1811)
Isotrias stramentana (Guenee, 1845)
Lathronympha sardinica Trematerra, 1995
Lathronympha strigana (Fabricius, 1775)
Lepteucosma huebneriana Kocak, 1980
Lobesia abscisana (Doubleday, 1849)
Lobesia artemisiana (Zeller, 1847)
Lobesia bicinctana (Duponchel, 1844)
Lobesia botrana (Denis & Schiffermuller, 1775)
Lobesia indusiana (Zeller, 1847)
Lobesia limoniana (Milliere, 1860)
Lobesia littoralis (Westwood & Humphreys, 1845)
Lobesia porrectana (Zeller, 1847)
Lobesia quaggana Mann, 1855
Lobesia reliquana (Hübner, 1825)
Lobesia euphorbiana (Freyer, 1842)
Lobesia occidentis Falkovitsh, 1970
Lozotaenia cupidinana (Staudinger, 1859)
Lozotaenia forsterana (Fabricius, 1781)
Lozotaenia mabilliana (Ragonot, 1875)
Lozotaenia retiana (Turati, 1913)
Lozotaenia straminea (Schawerda, 1936)
Lozotaeniodes cupressana (Duponchel, 1836)
Lozotaeniodes formosana (Frolich, 1830)
Metendothenia atropunctana (Zetterstedt, 1839)
Neosphaleroptera nubilana (Hübner, 1799)
Notocelia cynosbatella (Linnaeus, 1758)
Notocelia incarnatana (Hübner, 1800)
Notocelia mediterranea (Obraztsov, 1952)
Notocelia roborana (Denis & Schiffermuller, 1775)
Notocelia rosaecolana (Doubleday, 1850)
Notocelia tetragonana (Stephens, 1834)
Notocelia trimaculana (Haworth, 1811)
Notocelia uddmanniana (Linnaeus, 1758)
Olethreutes arcuella (Clerck, 1759)
Olindia schumacherana (Fabricius, 1787)
Orthotaenia undulana (Denis & Schiffermuller, 1775)
Osthelderiella amardiana Obraztsov, 1961
Oxypteron exiguana (de La Harpe, 1860)
Oxypteron schawerdai (Rebel, 1936)
Pammene albuginana (Guenee, 1845)
Pammene amygdalana (Duponchel, 1842)
Pammene argyrana (Hübner, 1799)
Pammene aurana (Fabricius, 1775)
Pammene aurita Razowski, 1991
Pammene blockiana (Herrich-Schäffer, 1851)
Pammene clanculana (Tengstrom, 1869)
Pammene cytisana (Zeller, 1847)
Pammene fasciana (Linnaeus, 1761)
Pammene gallicana (Guenee, 1845)
Pammene gallicolana (Lienig & Zeller, 1846)
Pammene germmana (Hübner, 1799)
Pammene giganteana (Peyerimhoff, 1863)
Pammene insulana (Guenee, 1845)
Pammene juniperana (Milliere, 1858)
Pammene laserpitiana Huemer & Erlebach, 1999
Pammene luedersiana (Sorhagen, 1885)
Pammene obscurana (Stephens, 1834)
Pammene ochsenheimeriana (Lienig & Zeller, 1846)
Pammene oxycedrana (Milliere, 1876)
Pammene populana (Fabricius, 1787)
Pammene querceti (Gozmany, 1957)
Pammene regiana (Zeller, 1849)
Pammene rhediella (Clerck, 1759)
Pammene spiniana (Duponchel, 1843)
Pammene splendidulana (Guenee, 1845)
Pammene suspectana (Lienig & Zeller, 1846)
Pammene trauniana (Denis & Schiffermuller, 1775)
Pandemis cerasana (Hübner, 1786)
Pandemis cinnamomeana (Treitschke, 1830)
Pandemis corylana (Fabricius, 1794)
Pandemis dumetana (Treitschke, 1835)
Pandemis heparana (Denis & Schiffermuller, 1775)
Paramesia gnomana (Clerck, 1759)
Pelatea klugiana (Freyer, 1836)
Pelochrista agrestana (Treitschke, 1830)
Pelochrista bleuseana (Oberthur, 1888)
Pelochrista caecimaculana (Hübner, 1799)
Pelochrista cannatana Trematerra, 2000
Pelochrista decolorana (Freyer, 1842)
Pelochrista fulvostrigana (Constant, 1888)
Pelochrista fusculana (Zeller, 1847)
Pelochrista griseolana (Zeller, 1847)
Pelochrista hepatariana (Herrich-Schäffer, 1851)
Pelochrista infidana (Hübner, 1824)
Pelochrista latericiana (Rebel, 1919)
Pelochrista mancipiana (Mann, 1855)
Pelochrista modicana (Zeller, 1847)
Pelochrista mollitana (Zeller, 1847)
Pelochrista sordicomana (Staudinger, 1859)
Pelochrista subtiliana (Jackh, 1960)
Periclepsis cinctana (Denis & Schiffermuller, 1775)
Phalonidia affinitana (Douglas, 1846)
Phalonidia albipalpana (Zeller, 1847)
Phalonidia contractana (Zeller, 1847)
Phalonidia curvistrigana (Stainton, 1859)
Phalonidia gilvicomana (Zeller, 1847)
Phalonidia manniana (Fischer v. Röslerstamm, 1839)
Phaneta pauperana (Duponchel, 1843)
Phiaris bipunctana (Fabricius, 1794)
Phiaris helveticana Duponchel, 1844
Phiaris metallicana (Hübner, 1799)
Phiaris micana (Denis & Schiffermuller, 1775)
Phiaris obsoletana (Zetterstedt, 1839)
Phiaris palustrana (Lienig & Zeller, 1846)
Phiaris schulziana (Fabricius, 1776)
Phiaris scoriana (Guenee, 1845)
Phiaris septentrionana (Curtis, 1835)
Phiaris stibiana (Guenee, 1845)
Phiaris turfosana (Herrich-Schäffer, 1851)
Phiaris umbrosana (Freyer, 1842)
Philedone gerningana (Denis & Schiffermuller, 1775)
Philedonides lunana (Thunberg, 1784)
Philedonides rhombicana (Herrich-Schäffer, 1851)
Phtheochroa drenowskyi (Rebel, 1916)
Phtheochroa duponchelana (Duponchel, 1843)
Phtheochroa frigidana (Guenee, 1845)
Phtheochroa fulvicinctana (Constant, 1893)
Phtheochroa ingridae Huemer, 1990
Phtheochroa inopiana (Haworth, 1811)
Phtheochroa pulvillana Herrich-Schäffer, 1851
Phtheochroa purana (Guenee, 1845)
Phtheochroa rugosana (Hübner, 1799)
Phtheochroa schreibersiana (Frolich, 1828)
Phtheochroa simoniana (Staudinger, 1859)
Phtheochroa sodaliana (Haworth, 1811)
Phtheochroa vulneratana (Zetterstedt, 1839)
Piniphila bifasciana (Haworth, 1811)
Pristerognatha penthinana (Guenee, 1845)
Prochlidonia amiantana (Hübner, 1799)
Propiromorpha rhodophana (Herrich-Schäffer, 1851)
Pseudargyrotoza conwagana (Fabricius, 1775)
Pseudeulia asinana (Hübner, 1799)
Pseudococcyx mughiana (Zeller, 1868)
Pseudococcyx posticana (Zetterstedt, 1839)
Pseudococcyx tessulatana (Staudinger, 1871)
Pseudococcyx turionella (Linnaeus, 1758)
Pseudohermenias abietana (Fabricius, 1787)
Pseudophiaris sappadana (Della Beffa & Rocca, 1937)
Pseudosciaphila branderiana (Linnaeus, 1758)
Ptycholoma lecheana (Linnaeus, 1758)
Ptycholomoides aeriferana (Herrich-Schäffer, 1851)
Retinia resinella (Linnaeus, 1758)
Rhopobota myrtillana (Humphreys & Westwood, 1845)
Rhopobota naevana (Hübner, 1817)
Rhopobota stagnana (Denis & Schiffermuller, 1775)
Rhopobota ustomaculana (Curtis, 1831)
Rhyacionia buoliana (Denis & Schiffermuller, 1775)
Rhyacionia duplana (Hübner, 1813)
Rhyacionia pinicolana (Doubleday, 1849)
Rhyacionia pinivorana (Lienig & Zeller, 1846)
Selania capparidana (Zeller, 1847)
Selania leplastriana (Curtis, 1831)
Selania resedana (Obraztsov, 1959)
Selenodes karelica (Tengstrom, 1875)
Sparganothis pilleriana (Denis & Schiffermuller, 1775)
Spatalistis bifasciana (Hübner, 1787)
Sphaleroptera alpicolana (Frolich, 1830)
Spilonota laricana (Heinemann, 1863)
Spilonota ocellana (Denis & Schiffermuller, 1775)
Stictea mygindiana (Denis & Schiffermuller, 1775)
Strophedra nitidana (Fabricius, 1794)
Strophedra weirana (Douglas, 1850)
Syndemis musculana (Hübner, 1799)
Thiodia citrana (Hübner, 1799)
Thiodia lerneana (Treitschke, 1835)
Thiodia major (Rebel, 1903)
Thiodia torridana (Lederer, 1859)
Thiodia trochilana (Frolich, 1828)
Tortricodes alternella (Denis & Schiffermuller, 1775)
Tortrix viridana Linnaeus, 1758
Tosirips magyarus Razowski, 1987
Xerocnephasia rigana (Sodoffsky, 1829)
Zeiraphera griseana (Hübner, 1799)
Zeiraphera isertana (Fabricius, 1794)
Zeiraphera ratzeburgiana (Saxesen, 1840)
Zeiraphera rufimitrana (Herrich-Schäffer, 1851)

Urodidae
Wockia asperipunctella (Bruand, 1851)

Yponomeutidae
Cedestis gysseleniella Zeller, 1839
Cedestis subfasciella (Stephens, 1834)
Euhyponomeuta stannella (Thunberg, 1788)
Kessleria albescens (Rebel, 1899)
Kessleria alpicella (Stainton, 1851)
Kessleria alternans (Staudinger, 1871)
Kessleria apenninica Huemer & Mutanen, 2015
Kessleria caflischiella (Frey, 1880)
Kessleria cottiensis Huemer & Mutanen, 2015
Kessleria insubrica Huemer & Tarmann, 1993
Kessleria klimeschi Huemer & Tarmann, 1992
Kessleria nivescens Burmann, 1980
Kessleria orobiae Huemer & Mutanen, 2015
Kessleria petrobiella (Zeller, 1868)
Kessleria saxifragae (Stainton, 1868)
Niphonympha dealbatella (Zeller, 1847)
Ocnerostoma piniariella Zeller, 1847
Paradoxus osyridellus Stainton, 1869
Parahyponomeuta egregiella (Duponchel, 1839)
Paraswammerdamia albicapitella (Scharfenberg, 1805)
Paraswammerdamia nebulella (Goeze, 1783)
Pseudoswammerdamia combinella (Hübner, 1786)
Scythropia crataegella (Linnaeus, 1767)
Swammerdamia caesiella (Hübner, 1796)
Swammerdamia compunctella Herrich-Schäffer, 1855
Swammerdamia pyrella (Villers, 1789)
Yponomeuta cagnagella (Hübner, 1813)
Yponomeuta evonymella (Linnaeus, 1758)
Yponomeuta irrorella (Hübner, 1796)
Yponomeuta mahalebella Guenee, 1845
Yponomeuta malinellus Zeller, 1838
Yponomeuta padella (Linnaeus, 1758)
Yponomeuta plumbella (Denis & Schiffermuller, 1775)
Yponomeuta rorrella (Hübner, 1796)
Yponomeuta sedella Treitschke, 1832
Zelleria hepariella Stainton, 1849
Zelleria oleastrella (Milliere, 1864)

Ypsolophidae
Ochsenheimeria glabratella Muller-Rutz, 1914
Ochsenheimeria taurella (Denis & Schiffermuller, 1775)
Ochsenheimeria urella Fischer von Röslerstamm, 1842
Phrealcia eximiella (Rebel, 1899)
Ypsolopha albiramella (Mann, 1861)
Ypsolopha alpella (Denis & Schiffermuller, 1775)
Ypsolopha asperella (Linnaeus, 1761)
Ypsolopha dentella (Fabricius, 1775)
Ypsolopha falcella (Denis & Schiffermuller, 1775)
Ypsolopha horridella (Treitschke, 1835)
Ypsolopha lucella (Fabricius, 1775)
Ypsolopha mucronella (Scopoli, 1763)
Ypsolopha nemorella (Linnaeus, 1758)
Ypsolopha parenthesella (Linnaeus, 1761)
Ypsolopha persicella (Fabricius, 1787)
Ypsolopha scabrella (Linnaeus, 1761)
Ypsolopha sequella (Clerck, 1759)
Ypsolopha sylvella (Linnaeus, 1767)
Ypsolopha ustella (Clerck, 1759)
Ypsolopha vittella (Linnaeus, 1758)

Zygaenidae
Adscita albanica (Naufock, 1926)
Adscita alpina (Alberti, 1937)
Adscita geryon (Hübner, 1813)
Adscita italica (Alberti, 1937)
Adscita statices (Linnaeus, 1758)
Adscita mannii (Lederer, 1853)
Aglaope infausta (Linnaeus, 1767)
Jordanita chloros (Hübner, 1813)
Jordanita globulariae (Hübner, 1793)
Jordanita tenuicornis (Zeller, 1847)
Jordanita subsolana (Staudinger, 1862)
Jordanita budensis (Ad. & Au. Speyer, 1858)
Jordanita notata (Zeller, 1847)
Rhagades pruni (Denis & Schiffermuller, 1775)
Theresimima ampellophaga (Bayle-Barelle, 1808)
Zygaena carniolica (Scopoli, 1763)
Zygaena fausta (Linnaeus, 1767)
Zygaena hilaris Ochsenheimer, 1808
Zygaena occitanica (Villers, 1789)
Zygaena orana Duponchel, 1835
Zygaena brizae (Esper, 1800)
Zygaena corsica Boisduval, 1828
Zygaena cynarae (Esper, 1789)
Zygaena erythrus (Hübner, 1806)
Zygaena minos (Denis & Schiffermuller, 1775)
Zygaena punctum Ochsenheimer, 1808
Zygaena purpuralis (Brunnich, 1763)
Zygaena rubicundus (Hübner, 1817)
Zygaena sarpedon (Hübner, 1790)
Zygaena ephialtes (Linnaeus, 1767)
Zygaena exulans (Hohenwarth, 1792)
Zygaena filipendulae (Linnaeus, 1758)
Zygaena lavandulae (Esper, 1783)
Zygaena lonicerae (Scheven, 1777)
Zygaena loti (Denis & Schiffermuller, 1775)
Zygaena osterodensis Reiss, 1921
Zygaena oxytropis Boisduval, 1828
Zygaena rhadamanthus (Esper, 1789)
Zygaena romeo Duponchel, 1835
Zygaena transalpina (Esper, 1780)
Zygaena trifolii (Esper, 1783)
Zygaena viciae (Denis & Schiffermuller, 1775)

See also
List of butterflies of Italy

External links
Fauna Europaea

Moths04
Italy04
Italy04